Ingvar Dalhaug (born 10 July 1957) is a Norwegian footballer. He played in one match for the Norway national football team in 1983.

References

External links
 
 

1957 births
Living people
Norwegian footballers
Norway international footballers
Place of birth missing (living people)
Association football forwards
SK Brann players